Michael Thomas Levenseller (born February 21, 1956) is a former American football wide receiver who played three seasons in the National Football League (NFL) with the Tampa Bay Buccaneers, Buffalo Bills and Cincinnati Bengals. He was drafted by the Oakland Raiders in the sixth round of the 1978 NFL Draft. He played college football at Washington State. Levenseller was also a member of the Edmonton Eskimos and Calgary Stampeders of the Canadian Football League.

Early years and college career
Levenseller attended Curtis Senior High School in University Place, Washington. 

He played college football for the Washington State Cougars. He was a Pacific-8 first-team, AP All-West Coast first-team, and AP All-America honorable mention wide receiver selection his junior and senior seasons, 1976 and 1977. He recorded 2,061 receiving yards on 121 receptions in his college career. Levenseller was inducted into the Washington State University Athletic Hall of Fame in 1992 and the 2006 Pacific Northwest Football Hall of Fame in 2006.

Professional career
Levenseller was selected by the Oakland Raiders with the 164th pick in the 1978 NFL Draft. He played in two games for the Tampa Bay Buccaneers in 1978. He played in two games for the Buffalo Bills in 1978. Levenseller appeared in 20 games for the Cincinnati Bengals from 1979 to 1980.

He played in nine games for the Edmonton Eskimos in 1982, winning the 70th Grey Cup. He appeared in 24 games for the Calgary Stampeders from 1983 to 1984.

Coaching career
Levenseller served as a guest coach for the BC Lions in 1986, working with the wide receivers. He was wide receivers coach of the Toronto Argonauts from 1990 to 1991.

Levenseller served as wide receivers coach of the Washington State Cougars from 1992 to 2011. He also had stints as offensive coordinator. He was wide receivers coach of the Idaho Vandals of the University of Idaho in 2012.

References

External links
Just Sports Stats
College stats

Living people
1956 births
Players of American football from Washington (state)
American football wide receivers
Canadian football wide receivers
American players of Canadian football
Washington State Cougars football players
Tampa Bay Buccaneers players
Buffalo Bills players
Cincinnati Bengals players
Edmonton Elks players
Calgary Stampeders players
BC Lions coaches
Toronto Argonauts coaches
Washington State Cougars football coaches
Idaho Vandals football coaches
People from Bremerton, Washington